Shadakshari Settar (Kn. ಷಡ‍ಕ್ಷರಿ ಶೆಟ್ಟರ್; December 11, 1935 – February 28, 2020) was an Indian professor and scholar who had conducted research in the fields of Indian archaeology, art-history, history of religions and philosophy as well as classical literature.

Early life and education
Settar studied in Mysuru, Dharawad, and Cambridge University.

Career
 Professor of History and Archaeology, Karnataka University in Dharwad (1960s)
 Director, of the National Museum Institute of the History of Art, Conservation and Museology (1978).
 President, Indian Council of Historical Research (1996). 
Dr S Radhakrishnan Chair at the NIAS (2002-2010), Bengaluru, India, later became Professor Emeritus. 
Honorary Director of the Southern Centre of the Indira Gandhi National Centre for the Arts (2005).
 Visiting professor at various foreign universities including at Cambridge, Harvard, Heidelberg, Athens, Leiden.

Works
Works under Settar's personal authorship comprise four volumes on history of art, two on religion and philosophy, one on human civilization and four on historiography.

Books (In Kannada)
shravanabelagola (ಶ್ರವಣಬೆಳಗೊಳ (೧೯೮೧),ಅಭಿನವ ಬೆಂಗಳೂರು)
 Savige ahvana (ಸಾವಿಗೆ ಆಹ್ವಾನ (೨೦೦೪,೨೦೧೪)ಅಭಿನವ ಬೆಂಗಳೂರು)
 Shangam Tamilagam Mattu kannada Nadunudi(ಶಂಗಂ ತಮಿಳಗಂ ಮತ್ತು ಕನ್ನಡ ನಾಡು-ನುಡಿ (೨೦೦೭)ಅಭಿನವ ಬೆಂಗಳೂರು)
 somanathapura(ಸೋಮನಾಥಪುರ (೨೦೦೮)ಅಭಿನವ ಬೆಂಗಳೂರು)
 Badami chalukyara shasana sahithya(ಬಾದಾಮಿ ಚಾಳುಕ್ಯರ ಶಾಸನ ಸಾಹಿತ್ಯ (೨೦೧೨)ಅಭಿನವ ಬೆಂಗಳೂರು)
 Savannu arasi (ಸಾವನ್ನು ಅರಸಿ(೨೦೧೪)ಅಭಿನವ ಬೆಂಗಳೂರು)
 Haalagannada: Lipi, Lipikara and Lipi Vyavasaya)ಹಳಗನ್ನಡ- ಲಿಪಿ, ಲಿಪಿಕಾರ, ಲಿಪಿ ವ್ಯವಸಾಯ (೨೦೧೪)
 Halagannada Bhashe bhasha vikasa bhasha bandavya (ಹಳಗನ್ನಡ-ಭಾಷೆ, ಭಾಷಾ ವಿಕಾಸ ಮತ್ತು ಭಾಷಾ ಬಾಂಧವ್ಯ(೨೦೧೫)ಅಭಿನವ ಬೆಂಗಳೂರು)
 Prakrutha jagadvalaya (ಪ್ರಾಕೃತ ಜಗದ್ವಲಯ(೨೦೧೮)ಅಭಿನವ ಬೆಂಗಳೂರು)
 Ruvari (ರೂವಾರಿ (ಕನ್ನಡ ನಾಡಿನ ವಾಸ್ತು ಮತ್ತು ಶಿಲ್ಪಿಗಳ ಚರಿತ್ರೆ)(೨೦೧೮)ಅಭಿನವ ಬೆಂಗಳೂರು)

Books (English)
 Hoysala Sculpture in the National Museum, Copenhagen (1975)
 Sravana Belagola - An illustrated study, Dharwad (1981)
 Inviting Death, Historical Experiment on Sepulchar Hill, Dharwad (1986)
 Inviting Death: Indian Attitude Towards the Ritual Death (Leiden:E. J.Brill, 1989)
 Pursuing Death: Philosophy and Practice of Voluntary Termination of Life, Dharwad (1990)
 Hampi - A Medieval Metropolis, Bangalore (1990)
 Hoysala temples, Vol I, II, Bangalore (1991)
 Footprints of Artisans in History, Mysore (2003)
 Somanathapura, Bangalore (2008)
 Akssarameru's Kaliyuga Vipartan, Bangalore (2011)

Edited volumes
 Archaeological Survey of Mysore: Annual Reports, Vol II-IV, Dharwad (1976–77)
 Memorial Stones: A Study of the origin, significance and variety, Dharwad-Heidelberg (1982)
 Indian Archaeology in Retrospect, Vol I-IV, New Delhi (2002)
 Construction of Indian Railways, Vol I-III, New Delhi (1999)
 Jalianwala Bagh massacre, New Delhi (2000)
 Pangs of Partition, Vol I-II, New Delhi (2002)

Awards
In 2008 Settar was presented with the Sham.Ba. Joshi Award for his contributions to historical research.

References

External links
 https://web.archive.org/web/20150420091601/http://www.nias.res.in/aboutnias-people-faculty-ssettar.php
 http://www.frontline.in/navigation/?type=static&page=flonnet&rdurl=fl1706/17061120.htm
 Google Scholar report

1935 births
2020 deaths
20th-century Indian historians
Academic staff of Karnatak University
People from Mysore district
20th-century Indian archaeologists
English-language writers from India
Kannada-language writers
Indian social sciences writers
Scholars from Karnataka
Writers from Karnataka
Historians of India